Bruce Kenneth Walton (born December 25, 1962) is an American professional baseball coach and former player who is the pitching coach for the Jacksonville Jumbo Shrimp. He was a pitcher in Major League Baseball (MLB) from 1991 to 1994, with the Oakland Athletics, Montreal Expos, and Colorado Rockies.

Career
Walton became the bullpen coach for the Toronto Blue Jays on June 7, 2002. He was the pitching coach for the Blue Jays from October 30, 2009 to November 26, 2012.

In a game against the Seattle Mariners on September 13, 2012, Walton was struck by a piece of Edwin Encarnación's broken bat, and left the bench with forearm contusions.

Walton was appointed as the pitching coach of the Triple-A Iowa Cubs on December 18, 2013.  Before the 2015 season, he retired and moved to Calgary, Alberta, and was replaced by Mike Cather.

Walton was named as the pitching coach for the Jupiter Hammerheads in the Miami Marlins organization for the 2018 season.

Walton was named as the pitching coach for the AA Jacksonville Jumbo Shrimp of the Miami Marlins organization for the 2019 season.

References

External links

 MLB biography

1962 births
Living people
American expatriate baseball players in Canada
Baseball coaches from California
Baseball players from California
Colorado Rockies players
Colorado Springs Sky Sox players
Hawaii Rainbow Warriors baseball players
Huntsville Stars players
Madison Muskies players
Major League Baseball pitchers
Major League Baseball pitching coaches
Minor league baseball coaches
Modesto A's players
Montreal Expos players
Oakland Athletics players
Ottawa Lynx players
Pocatello Gems players
St. Paul Saints players
Tacoma Tigers players
Toronto Blue Jays coaches
Tucson Toros players